Bisalpur is a City and a municipal board situated nearby Pilibhit City in the Pilibhit district of the state of Uttar Pradesh, India. The town is known for its sugar factory as well as its annual Ram Leela and Dushera festival.
Bisalpur is in between the two rivers, in West Doha river and in East katna river.
Before formation of new District Pilibhit, Bisalpur was under the District Bareilly. In 1913 AD after formation of new District Pilibhit, Bisalpur has come under District Pilibhit Administration. this city is well connected with 03 major cities (Bareilly, Pilihbhit and Shahjahanpur). Bisalpur is just 290 km away from National capital New Delhi and 250 km from the state capital Lucknow.
Bisalpur is famous for Annual Ramleela Fest, Dubey Taalab, Guleshwarnath Temple, Dargah Hazrat Gazi kamaal Degree college and Nagaich Market. Bisalpur is known for many things and places and people of Bisalpur have contributed in various fields one such example is Freedom fight Raees Mohammad who was a freedom fighter and a military man resident of mohalla gayaspur he have won many medals for his extraordinary work he did for the country. he is well known for his charm and Character he played in the public domain now his generation resides in the Bisalpur mohalla gyaspur. Another important place is its railway station which has been modified for the broad gauge. This will help to get well connected with different cities of India.

Location
Bisalpur is located at coordinates, .

Bisalpur is connected to Pilibhit city and Shahjahanpur through State Highway 29. The Pilibhit Junction railway station also connects these cities on the Bareilly–Lakhimpur line, under the administration of the North Eastern Railways. There are express trains to Lucknow. Bisalpur is located at the junction of NH 731K with NH 730B and NH 730C.

Features

Agriculture is well developed in the Bisalpur area. Cultivated crops in Bisalpur Tehsil include wheat, rice and sugarcane. Bisalpur is known for its sugar factory and the shop Mahavir Sweets, Brahmanand Jewellers and Anoop Gupta (National Insurance).

Government Primary School in village Chandpura, is one of the most beautiful and well developed school in the tehsil Bisalpur. It was developed by its Principal Mr Santosh Kumar Gangwar.

Bisalpur is currently the largest Assembly seat of Pilibhit.
Bisalpur is known for its annual Ram Leela Dushera festival and the Gulashwar Nath Temple said to be made by Kunti in Mahabharat Kal.

Bara Patthar Chouraha is a historical place in Bisalpur, visited by Tatya Tope during the Indian Rebellion of 1857.

Demographics

 India census, Bisalpur had a population of 73,551. Males constituted 54% of the population and females 46%.  Bisalpur had an average literacy rate of 61.65%, lower than the state average of 67.68% – male literacy was 68.96% and female literacy was 53.43%.  13.93% of the population was under 6 years of age. The main colonies in the town include Patel Nagar, Durga Prasad Colony, Ram Nagar Colony, Mohalla Dubey, Mohalla Gyaspur, Mohalla Bakhtavar Lal, Station Road colony.

See also 

Barkhera
Bilsanda
Gularia Bhindara
Jahanabad
Kalinagar

References

External links 
Uttar Pradesh Assembly Elections
Bisalpur Assembly Elections

Cities and towns in Pilibhit district